The Blue Baths is a heritage geothermal baths building in Rotorua, in the North Island of New Zealand. The building is designed in the Spanish Mission style. It is listed as a Category 1 Historic Place by Heritage New Zealand.

The first Blue Baths at the Government Gardens site were opened in 1886, and stood for over 40 years before being demolished in 1932 when the present building was constructed alongside.

Construction of the new building was well advanced by August 1932.

On 26 January 2021, the Blue Baths was closed to the public after a seismic assessment found the building met only 15 percent of the strength requirements for new buildings.

References

External links 

 Blue Baths at Heritage New Zealand
 Blue Baths in 1930's tourism brochure at Alexander Turnbull Library
 The Blue Baths Establishment former leaseholder

Buildings and structures in Rotorua 
Heritage New Zealand Category 1 historic places in the Bay of Plenty Region 
Mission Revival architecture